The Big Red Book of Modern Chinese Literature  is an anthology of Chinese literature edited by Yunte Huang and published in 2016 by W. W. Norton & Company. Huang, a professor of English at the University of California, Santa Barbara, described the book as a "search for the soul of modern China" in the introduction.

Contents
The book is 600 pages long and has works spanning about 100 years until its publishing date, with almost 50 authors represented. The works were translated by multiple people.

The works were placed in three sections: the Republican Era which spans from 1911 to 1949 and includes works from the New Culture Movement; the Revolutionary Era, spanning 1949 to 1976; and the Post-Mao Era, which has works since 1976. The portions of the book post 1990 are heavily focused on poetry and have less emphasis on urban fiction.

Pre-1949 works:
Works by Ba Jin, Lu Xun, and Mao Dun
An excerpt of Tales of Hulan River
Works of poetry

Reception
Julia Lovell of The New York Times wrote that "it’s heartening to see a serious publisher, one whose list is geared to the general reader, invest in an anthology that manages to combine the established canon with less-well-known selections." She argued that the book should have included works by Eileen Chang, and that male writers were represented too heavily in this anthology of modern Chinese writing.

References

2016 non-fiction books
W. W. Norton & Company books